All City may refer to:
All City (rap group), a rap music group based in Brooklyn, New York
All City High, a high school in Rochester, New York
All City (Downsyde album), 2008
All City (Northern State album), 2004
All City Chess Club, a rap music collective founded by Lupe Fiasco
All City (bike brand)